Behind the Times E.P. is an EP by AFI, released on 11 June 1993 on Key Lime Pie Records. It is the band's first EP, and second overall after their split EP with Loose Change earlier in the year.

The EP was reissued in October 2016 via Atom Age Industries, a company owned by former AFI bassist Geoff Kresge. The reissue featured slightly altered artwork on a glossier sleeve, but was otherwise identical.

Tracks 1 and 2 were re-recorded and released on the vinyl pressing of Very Proud of Ya and later on the AFI retrospective. Tracks 3-5 were rerecorded for AFI's debut full-length album, Answer That and Stay Fashionable.

Track listing

Personnel 
Credits adapted from liner notes.

 Adam Carson – drums
 Davey Havok – vocals
 Keith Gaudette – engineer
 Geoff Kresge – bass, layout 
 Kim Hansen – back cover photo 
 Markus Stopholese – guitar

Studios
 Recorded at City of Light, Lakeport, CA

Release history

References

1993 debut EPs
AFI (band) EPs